Faris Al-Rawi is a Trinidadian and Tobagonian politician. He was the former Attorney General of Trinidad and Tobago from 2015 to 2022. He is also a Member of the House of Representatives for the constituency of San Fernando West.

Early life 

Faris Al-Rawi, was born in San Fernando. He is the son of Husam Al-Rawi and Diane Seukeran. His father is a Muslim Iraqi Arab, while his mother, a Presbyterian Indo-Trinidadian, also represented the San Fernando West constituency in Parliament. His maternal grandfather, Lionel Frank Seukeran, served in Parliament as a member of the Democratic Labour Party, a former opposing  party of the People's National Movement and predecessor to the United National Congress. His maternal great-grandfather was Pundit Seukeran Sharma, a Hindu priest, from Tableland, Princes Town, Trinidad and Tobago.

Al-Rawi was educated at Presentation College, San Fernando, the University of the West Indies and completed a master's degree in Law at King's College London.

Al-Rawi claims descent from the Islamic Prophet Muhammad through his Iraqi father, but he is noted for his relaxed religious views and mixed religious background. He has described himself as "the son of an Iraqi Muslim man and a Trinidadian Presbyterian woman and a Hindu [maternal] grandfather". He is married to Mona Nahous who is a Catholic of Arab descent. He has also said he has fasted for Divali, Ramadan, and Lent and calls himself a "child of God" when asked what his religion was. He has said he has never eaten pork and that alcohol is not for him.

Political career 

Al-Rawi entered politics in 1995 as a legal advisor to the Tunapuna – Piarco Regional Corporation. He served as an Alderman in the Port of Spain City Corporation between 2003 and 2006 and was appointed an Opposition Senator in 2010. Al-Rawi contested San Fernando West constituency in the 2015 General Election, beating Raziah Ahmed of the United National Congress. Newly elected Prime Minister Keith Rowley appointed Al-Rawi as Attorney-General and he served from 2015 to 2022.

Controversy 

In October 2016 Al-Rawi's children were photographed in possession of high powered military grade assault rifles. He responded that they were receiving training from the Trinidad and Tobago Defence Force in response to unreported death threats. The fact of their training was confirmed by the Defence Force.

References

Living people
University of the West Indies alumni
Alumni of King's College London
Members of the House of Representatives (Trinidad and Tobago)
People's National Movement politicians
Attorneys General of Trinidad and Tobago
Trinidad and Tobago people of Iraqi descent
Trinidad and Tobago politicians of Indian descent
Hashemite people
1971 births
People from San Fernando, Trinidad and Tobago